Toora is a satellite locality of Murray Bridge in South Australia. Its boundaries were formalised in 2000. It was named for the Toora Irrigation Area on the west bank of the Murray River.

See also 
 List of cities and towns in South Australia

References 

Towns in South Australia